Lordship of Newry is a historic barony in County Down, Northern Ireland.

List of settlements
Below is a list of settlements in Lordship of Newry:

City
Newry

List of civil parishes
Below is a list of civil parishes in Lordship of Newry:
Newry (also partly in baronies of Iveagh Upper, Lower Half, Oneilland West and Orior Upper)

References

 
Newry